The 2022 Westmeath Senior Hurling Championship was the 118th staging of the Westmeath Senior Hurling Championship since its establishment by the Westmeath County Board in 1903. The championship began on 23 August 2021 and ended on 3 October 2021.

Cullion were promoted to the championship Senior 'B' Hurling champions, replacing relegated Crookedwood from the previous year. Cullion would subsequently be relegated, finishing bottom of the group stage without a win.

Raharney entered the championship as the defending champions
, however, they were beaten by Castletown Geoghegan at the semi-final stage.

The final was played on 3 October 2022 at TEG Cusack Park in Mullingar, between Raharney and Castletown Geoghegan, in what was third meeting in a final in four years. Castletown Geoghegan won the match by 0-22 to 1-14 to claim their 14th championship title overall and first since 2017, qualifying them for the 2022 Leinster Senior Club Hurling Championship.

Results

Group stage

Fixtures

Knockout stage

Fixtures

References

External links
 Fixtures and results at the Westmeath GAA website

Westmeath Senior Hurling Championship
Westmeath Senior Hurling Championship
Westmeath Senior Hurling Championship